was a town located in Watarai District, Mie Prefecture, Japan.

As of 2003, the town had an estimated population of 5,081 and a density of 50.47 persons per km². The total area was 100.68 km².

On February 14, 2005, Ōmiya, along with the town of Kisei, and the village of Ōuchiyama (all from Watarai District), was merged to create the town of Taiki and thus no longer exists as an independent municipality.

External links
 Official website of Taiki 

Dissolved municipalities of Mie Prefecture